Rinfret is a railway junction in the city of Saint-Jérôme in the Canadian province of Quebec.

It is located at mile 36.4 of the Montfort Spur of the Quebec Gatineau Railway.
.

One reference states that one of the lines that meet at this junction was built by the Great Northern Railway of Canada, which was later acquired by Canadian Northern Railway.

See also
Rinfret (list of notable persons with the surname Rinfret)

References

Railway stations in Laurentides
Saint-Jérôme